Andreykovo is a rural locality (a village) in Fominskoye Rural Settlement, Sheksninsky District, Vologda Oblast, Russia. The population was 1 as of 2002.

Geography 
Andreykovo is located 60 km southeast of Sheksna (the district's administrative centre) by road. Fominskoye is the nearest rural locality.

References 

Rural localities in Sheksninsky District